The Netherlands Coastguard is civil organisation that caries out tasks on the Netherlands Northsea for six Miniseries under administration of the Royal Netherlands Navy. Its operational command falls under the Ministry of Defence and the Royal Netherlands Navy is responsible for its coordination.

History
While the Netherlands Coastguard was officially established on 26 February 1987, this does not mean there was no coastguard active in the Netherlands before 1987. Since 1883 there has been a coastguard active in the Netherlands in some sort of an unofficial capacity. In that year the Dutch government published a report named 'het houden van een uitkijk en het rapporteren van in nood verkerende schepen aan Hoofden Kustwacht'. The report was a reaction to the public outcry over an incident that had taken place in 1882, when the Dutch ship, HNLMS Adder, sunk off-coast at Scheveningen and led to the death of all 65 people aboard. The report led to lighthouses cooperating better with the relevant government agencies to help ships that were in trouble off-coast.

After World War II the area that could be covered off-coast became bigger with new technologies such as radars and better means of communication. Furthermore, the government became more interested in the   North Sea. They wanted to protect their interests, such as fishery, oil and gas extraction, and sand and gravel extraction. Eventually, this led to each ministry establishing its own department that was focused on the North Sea and guarding the coast of the Netherlands. At one point there were more than twenty government organisations at work off the coast of the Netherlands. To stop this fragmentation, Minister Smit-Kroes of Traffic and water management ordered in 1984 an investigation to research how to make guarding the coast of the Netherlands more efficient and effective. The results of this report were published in 1986 and led to the official creation of one coastguard agency, namely the Netherlands Coastguard.

Organisation
The Netherlands Coastguard carries out duties for six government ministries, these ministries are the:

Ministry of Infrastructure and Water Management
Ministry of Defence
Ministry of Justice and Security
Ministry of Finance
Ministry of Economic Affairs and Climate Policy
Ministry of Agriculture, Nature and Food Quality

Tasks

The Coastguard tasks can be divided into Provision of service tasks and Law enforcement tasks.
Provision of service tasks:
Monitoring, handling and coordinating national and international Distress, Urgency and Safety radio traffic;
Maritime assistance and Search and Rescue;
Limiting and dealing with the aftermath of disasters and incidents;
Wherever necessary, implementing vessel traffic services (buoys, vessel traffic service, instructions)
Maritime traffic research
Clearing out explosives
Law enforcement tasks:
Maintaining law and order (police)
Monitoring import, export and transit of goods (customs)
Upholding laws regarding environment, sea fishing, nautical traffic, ships equipment and offshore activities
Border control

Equipment

Vessels 
The Coast Guard has no vessels of its own, so resources are made available by the cooperating ministries and services

See also
Dutch Caribbean Coast Guard

Footnotes

External links
Netherlands Coastguard

Coast guards
Sea rescue organizations
Government agencies of the Netherlands
1987 establishments in the Netherlands
Military units and formations established in 1987

nl:Kustwacht#Nederlandse kustwacht